Mart Siimann (born 21 September 1946) was the Prime Minister of Estonia from 1997 to 1999, representing the liberal/centrist Estonian Coalition Party. He was the president of the Estonian Olympic Committee from 2001 to 2012.

Born at Kilingi-Nõmme, Siimann studied at the University of Tartu from 1965 to 1971. In 1971, he graduated as a philologist-psychologist. From 1989 to 1992, he was the director of the Estonian Television and from 1992 to 1995, Managing Director of Advertising Television Co. He was a member of the Estonian Parliament from 1995 to 1997, and from 1999 to 2003, elected as a Coalition Party member (but since 2001 served as the chairman of the centre-left/social democratic association "Mõistuse ja Südamega" ("With Reason and Heart")).

References

External links 
 

1946 births
Living people
People from Kilingi-Nõmme
Communist Party of the Soviet Union members
Estonian Coalition Party politicians
Prime Ministers of Estonia
Members of the Riigikogu, 1995–1999
Members of the Riigikogu, 1999–2003
Estonian television personalities
Estonian radio personalities
Estonian referees and umpires
21st-century Estonian politicians
University of Tartu alumni
Recipients of the Order of the National Coat of Arms, 2nd Class